Palam railway station is a small railway station in Palam which is a residential and commercial neighborhood of the South West Delhi of Delhi. Its code is PM. The station is part of  Delhi Suburban Railway. The station consists of three platforms. The platform is not well sheltered. It lacks many facilities including water and sanitation.

Trains 

The following trains run from Palam railway station :

 Ala Hazrat Express
 Ala Hazrat Express (via Bhildi)
 Delhi–Farukh Nagar Passenger (unreserved)
 Delhi–Barmer Link Express
 Delhi–Rewari Passenger (unreserved)
 Delhi Sarai Rohilla–Farukhnagar Passenger
 Delhi Sarai Rohilla–Rewari Passenger (unreserved)
 Delhi Sarai Rohilla–Porbandar Express
 Delhi–Rewari Passenger (unreserved)
 Farukhnagar–Saharanpur Janta Express (unreserved)
 Malani Express
 Mandore Express
 Meerut Cantt.– Rewari Passenger (unreserved)
 Tilak Bridge–Rewari Jn. Passenger (unreserved)

See also

 Hazrat Nizamuddin railway station
 New Delhi railway station
 Delhi Junction Railway station
 Anand Vihar Railway Terminal
 Sarai Rohilla railway station
 Delhi Metro

References

External links

Railway stations in North Delhi district
Delhi railway division